Alice in Glamourland is a 2004 Dutch comedy film, directed by Pieter Kramer and starring Linda de Mol and Joan Collins. The story is about a poor single mother, who participates in a course about 'How to marry a millionaire'.

The film received a Golden Film (100,000 visitors).

Plot
A poor, single woman called Ellis (Linda de Mol), with a son, who meets Susan (Joan Collins), who wrote a successful book about 'How to marry a millionaire' and who now teaches classes on the subject.

Ellis attends the course, which is offered her for free. As a result, she meets many millionaires, of which several want to marry her. For one man who seemed rich, this turns out not to be the case. Nevertheless, after all Ellis chooses him.

Cast
Linda de Mol as Ellis Vermeulen
Joan Collins as Susan
Chris Tates as Gijs
Kees Hulst as Meindert Jan

Accolades 
Golden Film for 100,000 visitors in the Netherlands (2004)
Golden Calf for Best Screenplay of a Feature Film (2004) for Mischa Alexander
Award for Best Feature at the Stony Brook Film Festival (2005) for Pieter Kramer

References

External links

2004 films
2004 comedy films
Dutch comedy films
2000s Dutch-language films